Louis Silverstein (October 10, 1919 – December 1, 2011) was an American artist and graphic designer who is best known for his work at The New York Times. He was inducted into the Art Directors Hall of Fame in 1984.

Biography 
Silverstein was born in Brooklyn, New York. He attended Boys High School and graduated from the Pratt Institute with a degree in fine arts. During World War II, Silverstein served in the Army Air Forces, doing graphic design. After the war, he attended the Chicago Institute of Design, where he was exposed to avant-garde design.

Silverstein worked for a variety of employers, including labor unions and an advertising agency. He was art director for Amerika, a Russian magazine prepared by the U.S. State Department for distribution in the Soviet Union.

In 1952, Silverstein joined the promotions department at The New York Times. He helped make the newspaper more readable in 1967, when he enlarged the typeface. In 1976, he changed the format of the front page from eight columns to six. Also that year, he helped introduce the new weekday sections of the newspaper ("SportsMonday", "Science Times", "Living", "Home", and "Weekend").

Silverstein was inducted into the Art Directors Hall of Fame in 1984. At the time, Massimo Vignelli said, "We are affected by all the factors in the environment around us, and nothing is more ubiquitous than the newspaper. By changing the Times and influencing so many newspapers in other cities, we are indebted to him for improving the quality of our lives."

After his 1985 retirement, Silverstein continued to consult to The New York Times and other newspapers. He was responsible for the new look of 35 regional newspapers as well as papers in Brazil, Kenya, and Spain.

Bibliography

Sources
 
 
 
 
 
 
 
 
 
 
 
 
 
 

1919 births
2011 deaths
American graphic designers
Pratt Institute alumni
The New York Times people
Boys High School (Brooklyn) alumni